A prasat, or more accurately, kudakhan or rueanyot, is a Thai architectural form reserved for royal palaces of the monarch or for sacred religious structures. It is a building featuring an ornate roof structure, usually multi-tiered, with one or more spires. The form symbolizes the centre of the universe, which is traditionally associated with the monarch or the Buddha. Prasat forms are widely used in the buildings of the Grand Palace, and are also found in some Buddhist temples (wat) and in the architecture of the temporary crematoria used for royal funerals.

Architectural historians have classified kudakhan into several categories, according to the shape of the spire: mondop-shaped, prang-shaped, mongkut-shaped, and others (including stupa-shaped and phra kiao–shaped, depending on the author).

Gallery

Mondop-shaped

Prang-shaped

Mongkut-shaped

See also
 Pyatthat – Burmese equivalent

References

Architecture in Thailand
Traditional Thai architecture